is a Japanese actress and voice actress.

Career
Nomura was previously affiliated with Tokyo Actor's Consumer's Cooperative Society, then Aoni Production and now she is affiliated with Ken Production, an agency founded by the late Kenji Utsumi.

Personal life
She was married to fellow voice actor Kenji Utsumi until his death in 2013.

Notable roles

Animation
Speed Racer (1967): Mitchi Shimura ("Trixie"; episode 5 onwards)
Andersen Stories (1971): Gerda, Ilze
Babel II (1973): Yumiko Furumi
Sazae-san (1976–2005): Wakame Isono (2nd voice)
Doraemon (1979-2005): Shizuka Minamoto
Calimero (1974): Priscila
Maya the Bee (1975): Maya
Kämpfer (2009): Tora Harakiri

Live-action
Sono Koe no Anata e (2022), herself

Awards

References

External links
 

1938 births
Living people
Voice actresses from Yokohama
Japanese video game actresses
Japanese voice actresses
Tokyo Actor's Consumer's Cooperative Society voice actors
Aoni Production voice actors
Ken Production voice actors
20th-century Japanese actresses
21st-century Japanese actresses